Megachile tapytensis is a species of bee in the family Megachilidae. It was described by Mitchell in 1929.

References

Tapytensis
Insects described in 1929